Jayaweera Bandara may refer to:

 Jayavira Bandara, King of Kandy ( 1511–1552)
 Jayaweera Bandara (cricketer) (born 1970), Sri Lankan cricketer

Sinhalese names